The 1978 Grambling State Tigers football team represented Grambling State University as a member of the Southwestern Athletic Conference (SWAC) during the 1978 NCAA Division I-AA football season. Led by 36th-year head coach Eddie Robinson, the Tigers compiled an overall record of 9–1–1, with a mark of 5–0–1 in conference play, winning the SWAC title. Grambling State was invited to the Orange Blossom Classic, where they lost to Florida A&M.

Schedule

References

Grambling State
Grambling State Tigers football seasons
Southwestern Athletic Conference football champion seasons
Grambling State Tigers football